David Weber (born 1952) is an American science fiction and fantasy author.

David Weber may also refer to:

David Weber (clarinetist) (1913–2006), American classical clarinetist
David J. Weber (1940–2010), American historian whose research focused on the history of the Southwestern U.S.
David Ollier Weber (born 1938), American journalist and novelist
David P. Weber, American whistleblower and former official at the U.S. Securities and Exchange Commission

See also
David Webber (born 1955), information technologist
David H. Webber, author, law professor